Dinajpur Sadar is an upazila of Dinajpur District in the Division of Rangpur, Bangladesh.

Geography
It has 67,061 households and total area 354.34 km2.

Dinajpur Sadar Upazila is bounded by Kaharole and Khansama Upazilas on the north, Chirirbandar Upazila on the east, Kumarganj and Gangarampur CD Blocks in Dakshin Dinajpur district, West Bengal, India, on the south, and Biral Upazila on the west.

Demographics
As of the 1991 Bangladesh census, Dinajpur Sadar has a population of 357,888. Males constitute 52.08% of the population, and females 47.92%. This Upazila's eighteen up population is 187,016. Dinajpur Sadar has an average literacy rate of 41.1% (7+ years), and the national average of 32.4% literate. Also, Nanabari is at Dinajpur.

Administration
Dinajpur Sadar Upazila is divided into Dinajpur Municipality and ten union parishads: Askorpur, Auliapur, Chealgazi, Fazilpur, Kamalpur, Sankarpur, Shashora, Shekpura, Sundorbon, and Uthrail. The union parishads are subdivided into 211 mauzas and 207 villages.

Dinajpur Municipality is subdivided into 12 wards and 80 mahallas.

Member of Parliament: Iqbalur Rahim.

Education

According to Banglapedia, Dinajpur Government Girls' High School, founded in 1869, is a notable secondary school. Dinajpur Zilla School was established in 1854 during the British reign. It is located at the centre of the Dinajpur town.

There is also a Textile College in the district.

See also
Upazilas of Bangladesh
Districts of Bangladesh
Divisions of Bangladesh

References

Upazilas of Dinajpur District, Bangladesh